Ballyhoo is a compilation album by Echo & the Bunnymen, released in 1997. Liner notes were written by the group's former manager Bill Drummond.

Track listing 
 "Rescue"
 "Do It Clean"
 "Villiers Terrace"
 "All That Jazz"
 "Over the Wall"
 "A Promise"	
 "The Disease"
 "The Back of Love"
 "The Cutter"
 "Never Stop"	
 "The Killing Moon"
 "Silver"
 "Seven Seas"
 "Bring On the Dancing Horses"
 "People Are Strange"
 "The Game"
 "Lips Like Sugar"
 "Bedbugs and Ballyhoo"

References 

Echo & the Bunnymen compilation albums
1997 compilation albums